UWO refers to the University of Western Ontario, London, Canada.

UWO may also refer to:

Unexplained wealth order, a court order in the United Kingdom
University of Wisconsin–Oshkosh, United States
Unit Watts Out, a non-standard unit of power rating, aka Max Watts Out (MWO)